Harold "Harry" Hollis (12 December 1913 – 18 August 1982) was a Welsh footballer who played as a defender. He made one appearance in the English Football League with Wrexham, and played in the Welsh leagues with Connah's Quay and Pwllheli.

He also guested for Chester City during World War II.

References

1913 births
1982 deaths
Welsh footballers
Association football defenders
Connah's Quay Nomads F.C. players
Wrexham A.F.C. players
Pwllheli F.C. players
Chester City F.C. wartime guest players
English Football League players